Mount Pleasant is a historic home and farm and national historic district located near Staunton, Augusta County, Virginia. The house was built about 1780–1810, and is a two-story, hall-parlor plan limestone structure with a rear ell dating to the mid-19th century. It is reflective of architecture of the Federal era. It has an original one-story brick ell. Also on the property are a contributing barn, corncrib, garage, storage shed, chicken house, the spring house, and an equipment shed. The property also include the ruins of a mill.

It was listed on the National Register of Historic Places in 1989.

References

Farms on the National Register of Historic Places in Virginia
Federal architecture in Virginia
Houses completed in 1810
Houses in Augusta County, Virginia
National Register of Historic Places in Augusta County, Virginia
Historic districts on the National Register of Historic Places in Virginia